The Philadelphia Premium Outlets is a  open-air outlet mall located in Limerick Township, Montgomery County, Pennsylvania, 35 miles northwest of Philadelphia. It is located off an interchange of U.S. Route 422 near the Limerick Nuclear Power Plant. It is owned by the Premium Outlets division of Simon Property Group.

History
Construction of the Philadelphia Premium Outlets began on September 20, 2006 with a goal to provide more shopping options for residents of Montgomery County as well as additional tax revenue and jobs for the community. The Philadelphia Premium Outlets opened to huge crowds at 9 a.m. on November 8, 2007 with 120 stores. An expansion completed in April 2008 brought the number of stores to 150.

The center celebrated its 10th anniversary in 2017. In addition to welcoming many new retailers over the years, it has also retained more than half of the original 120 that were in business there on opening day in 2007.

Stores and services
The outlet mall is home to 150 stores including Lane Bryant, Gap Factory, Movado, Old Navy, Nike, Polo Ralph Lauren, Tommy Hilfiger, Restoration Hardware, Forever 21, and H&M. It also has a food court, with restaurants such as Wendy's, Sbarro, and Tony Luke's.

References

External links

Premium Outlets
Shopping malls in Pennsylvania
Shopping malls established in 2007
Tourist attractions in Montgomery County, Pennsylvania
Buildings and structures in Montgomery County, Pennsylvania
Outlet malls in the United States